Berenson is a surname. Notable people with the surname include:

 Alex Berenson, American writer and journalist
 Bernard Berenson, American art historian
 Berry Berenson, American model, actress, and photographer
 Gordon "Red" Berenson, Canadian ice hockey player and coach
 Lori Berenson, American jailed in Peru for terrorism related crimes
 Marisa Berenson, American actress and model
 Senda Berenson Abbott, American basketball player

Fictional characters:

 Jake Berenson, character in the Animorphs series
 Saul Berenson, character in the American political thriller TV series Homeland

English-language surnames
Jewish surnames
Patronymic surnames